Phil Spencer is an American business executive and the CEO of Microsoft Gaming. He is currently the head of the Xbox brand and leads the global creative and engineering teams responsible for gaming at Microsoft.

Personal life 
Spencer attended Ridgefield High School in Ridgefield, Washington, and then earned a bachelor's degree in technical and scientific communication from the University of Washington.

He serves on the boards of the First Tee of Greater Seattle and the Entertainment Software Association.

Career 
Spencer joined Microsoft in 1988 as an intern and has worked in a number of technical roles, leading the development of Microsoft's first CD-ROM-based titles (such as Encarta), development manager for Microsoft Money, and general manager of Microsoft's online and offline consumer productivity products including Microsoft Works and Microsoft Picture It! During his early time at Microsoft he was known by other employees to be an avid gamer, playing games such as Ultima Online in the office. 

With the launch of the Xbox in 2001, Spencer joined the Xbox team and served as general manager of Microsoft Game Studios EMEA, working with Microsoft's European developers and studios such as Lionhead Studios and Rare until 2008, when he became the general manager of Microsoft Studios, eventually becoming the studio's corporate vice president a year later. He has participated in Microsoft's E3 conferences since 2010.

In late March 2014, Satya Nadella announced in a corporate e-mail that Spencer was to "lead the Xbox, Xbox Live, Groove Music and Movies & TV teams, and Microsoft Studios" as part of the Windows and Devices division.

In September 2017, Spencer was promoted to the Senior Leadership Team, gaining the title of Executive Vice President of Gaming and reporting directly to CEO Satya Nadella.

In 2018, Spencer delivered the keynote address at the 2018 DICE Summit and spoke at the 2018 Game Awards.

In January 2022, along with Microsoft's acquisition of Activision Blizzard, Spencer was promoted to the role of CEO of Microsoft Gaming.

Since taking over both Xbox and the Gaming division, Spencer has advocated for cross-platform play, as well as launched key initiatives, such as reintroducing backward compatibility to the Xbox platform, the purchase of Mojang and Bethesda, the further development and support of Minecraft, the introduction of Xbox Game Pass, launching the Xbox Adaptive Controller, an increased focus on PC gaming, porting some Microsoft published games to other platforms including the Nintendo Switch, the launch of xCloud, and increasing the number of first-party development studios.

Spencer received the Lifetime Achievement award at the 25th Annual D.I.C.E. Awards on February 24, 2022, and the Andrew Yoon Legend award at the New York Game Awards on January 17, 2023.

References

External links 
 

Living people
Microsoft employees
Video game businesspeople
Businesspeople in software
American computer businesspeople
University of Washington alumni
20th-century American businesspeople
21st-century American businesspeople
Xbox
Xbox Game Studios
Year of birth missing (living people)